"Bridge of Light" is a song by American singer-songwriter Pink. It was released on December 2, 2011 by Sony Music. The song was written by Pink and long-time collaborator Billy Mann and serves as the theme song to the 2011 film Happy Feet Two. The song was a moderate success and became a top 10 hit in Austria, Germany, and Switzerland but failed to chart high in other countries due to minimal promotion.

Composition
This song is written in F major, but in the last chorus, the key goes up to G major.

Track listing
CD single and digital download
"Bridge of Light" (Pink featuring Happy Feet Two Chorus) – 4:06
"Dinner a La Sven" (Sydney Scoring Orchestra, Fiona Ziegler, Sun Yi and Cantillation Choir) – 3:34

Charts

Certifications

References

2011 singles
Pink (singer) songs
Songs written by Pink (singer)
Songs written by Billy Mann
Songs written for films
Songs containing the I–V-vi-IV progression
WaterTower Music singles